"The Roses of Success" is a song and musical number from the popular 1968 motion picture Chitty Chitty Bang Bang. In the film, it is sung when Grandpa Potts (played by Lionel Jeffries) is caught in the Vulgarian inventors' workshop and is forced to modify a car that floats or face the consequences.  The other imprisoned inventors sing this song in the hopes that they might cheer up the despondent Grandpa. He is cheered up and sings along, but in the end the car collapses.  The song is also featured prominently in the 2002 and 2005 stage musical versions of the film.  In American TV broadcasts of the 1968 motion picture, this song is often cut to fit into a two-hour time slot.  The song was written by the Sherman Brothers.

Literary sources
 Sherman, Robert B. Walt's Time: from before to beyond, Santa Clarita: Camphor Tree Publishers, 1998.

Roses of Success, The
Roses of Success, The
Songs written by the Sherman Brothers
Songs written for films